Rainer Schütterle (born March 21, 1966 in Kehl) is a German former professional footballer.

References

Honours
 UEFA Cup finalist: 1989

1966 births
Living people
People from Kehl
Sportspeople from Freiburg (region)
Association football midfielders
German footballers
Germany under-21 international footballers
Karlsruher SC players
VfB Stuttgart players
MSV Duisburg players
SV Ried players
SC Fortuna Köln players
Bundesliga players
2. Bundesliga players
Footballers from Baden-Württemberg
West German footballers
German expatriate sportspeople in Austria
Expatriate footballers in Austria
German expatriate footballers